All-American usually refers to a member of an honorary national sports team.

All-American may also refer to:

 All-American, a fictional character in the Marvel Comics universe
 All American (musical), by Mel Brooks
 All American (Hoodie Allen album), a 2012 album by Hoodie Allen
 All American (Nick Carter album), a 2015 album by Nick Carter
 82nd Airborne Division, nicknamed All-American, a United States Army unit
 Bally's All American, a video poker game
 Blue Bird All American, a line of school buses built by Blue Bird Corporation
 Mixed-breed dog or All American, usually in the United States
 The Mill City All-Americans, later the Lowell All-Americans, a collegiate summer baseball team now the Old Orchard Beach Raging Tide

See also